Reggae gi dem Dub is a studio album by Jamaican reggae artist Big Youth. It was recorded at the Harry J studio in Kingston, Jamaica.

Track listing
 "Inside Out"
 "Camp David Summit"
 "New Moon"
 "Tribute to Kenyatta"
 "Colour Red"
 "Progress (Part Two)"
 "Majority Rules"
 "Fulfilment"

Personnel
 Big Youth - vocals, arrangement, percussion
 Sylvan Morris - engineering, mixing
 Carlton "Santa" Davis - drums
 George "Fully" Fullwood - bass
 Tony Chin - rhythm guitar
 Earl "Chinna" Smith - lead guitar
 Keith McLeod - keyboards
 David Madden - trumpet
 Arnold Breckenridge - trumpet
 Vin Gordon - trombone
 Deadly Headly - alto saxophone
 Glen Da Costa - tenor saxophone
 Skully - percussion
 Keith Sterling - percussion
 Jimmy Becker - harmonica

Recording Information
 Recording : Harry J Studio (Kingston, JA)
 Engineer : Sylvan Morris
 Mixing Engineer : Big Youth & Sylvan Morris
 Arranger : Big Youth

References

1975 albums
Big Youth albums
Dub albums